Allotinus sarrastes is a butterfly in the family Lycaenidae. It was described by Hans Fruhstorfer in 1913. It is found in Myanmar, Thailand, Langkawi, Peninsular Malaysia, Borneo, Karimata, Sumatra, Sipora, Java and Mindanao.

References

Butterflies described in 1913
Allotinus
Butterflies of Borneo